Hazard pictograms form part of the international Globally Harmonized System of Classification and Labelling of Chemicals (GHS). Two sets of pictograms are included within the GHS: one for the labelling of containers and for workplace hazard warnings, and a second for use during the transport of dangerous goods. Either one or the other is chosen, depending on the target audience, but the two are not used together. The two sets of pictograms use the same symbols for the same hazards, although certain symbols are not required for transport pictograms. Transport pictograms come in wider variety of colors and may contain additional information such as a subcategory number.

Hazard pictograms are one of the key elements for the labelling of containers under the GHS, along with:
an identification of the product;
a signal word – either Danger or Warning – where necessary
hazard statements, indicating the nature and degree of the risks posed by the product
precautionary statements, indicating how the product should be handled to minimize risks to the user (as well as to other people and the general environment)
the identity of the supplier (who might be a manufacturer or importer)

The GHS chemical hazard pictograms are intended to provide the basis for or to replace national systems of hazard pictograms. It has still to be implemented by the European Union (CLP regulation) in 2009.

The GHS transport pictograms are the same as those recommended in the UN Recommendations on the Transport of Dangerous Goods, widely implemented in national regulations such as the U.S. Federal Hazardous Materials Transportation Act (49 U.S.C. 5101–5128) and D.O.T. regulations at 49 C.F.R. 100–185.

Physical hazards pictograms

Health hazards pictograms

Physical and health hazard pictograms

Environmental hazards pictograms

Transport pictograms

Class 1: Explosives

Class 2: Gases

Classes 3 and 4: Flammable liquids and solids

Other GHS transport classes

Non-GHS transport pictograms 
The following pictograms are included in the UN Model Regulations but have not been incorporated into the GHS because of the nature of the hazards.

Notes

References 

 (the "CLP Regulation")
 ("UN Model Regulations Rev.15")
 ("UN Manual of Tests and Criteria Rev.4")

External links

 GHS pictogram gallery from the United Nations Economic Commission for Europe

Hazard pictograms
Pictograms